Karaftu Rural District is in the Central District of Takab County, West Azerbaijan province, Iran. At the National Census of 2006, its population was 4,586 in 891 households. There were 3,792 inhabitants in 832 households at the following census of 2011. At the most recent census of 2016, the population of the rural district was 3,205 in 885 households. The largest of its 20 villages was Chap Darreh, with 623 people.

References 

Takab County

Rural Districts of West Azerbaijan Province

Populated places in West Azerbaijan Province

Populated places in Takab County